RTS2 (Serbian Cyrillic: РТС2; Second program of RTS (/), Second channel of RTS (/ ) or only Second (/ )) is a Serbian public TV channel operated by RTS. It focuses on culture, in addition to offering music and sporting events. Parliamentary sittings are also broadcast live on RTS2.

Though on average it doesn't draw high viewership, RTS2 often may win the viewing day with special sporting events or special parliamentary debates. RTS2 also broadcasts children's and educational programmes and reruns of old Serbian drama and comedy series.

Opened in 1971, it was, until the RTS1 transition to color in the mid 1970s, the only Serbian television station in color.

Current line-up

News and info
Ово је Србија (This is Serbia) – half-hour-long programme focusing on local and regional news across Serbia
Дозволите... (Allow..)– military affairs programme
У свету (In the World) – foreign policy programme
Профил и профит (Profile and Profit) – financial programme
Знање имање – agriculture programme
Сат вести (Newshour) – daily hourly news programme

Entertainment and music
У здравом телу (In a healthy body) – physical exercise magazine
Лети, лети, песмо моја мила (Fly, fly, my dear song) – music programme
Концерт за добро јутро (Good Morning Concert) – morning music programme
Миракулус: Авантуре Бубамаре и Црног Мачора (Mirakulus: Adventures of Ladybug and Black Cat) - cartoon programme
Мој мали пони: Пријатељство је магија (My Little Pony: Friendship is Magic) - cartoon programme
Продавница најмањих љубимаца (Littlest Pet Shop) - cartoon programme
Трансформерси: прерушени роботи (Transformers: Robots in Disguise) - cartoon programme
Чак и пријатељи (The Adventures of Chuck and Friends) - cartoon programme
Машине страшне приче (Masha's Spooky stories) - cartoon programme
Па, па летимо (Waybuloo) - cartoon programme

Documentary and talk show
Контекст 21 (Context 21) – science magazine
Трезор (Safe) – television history programme
Датум (Date) – review of important historical events
Верски календар (Religious Calendar)
Траг (Footstep)
Књига утисака – Serbian tourism magazine
Свет здравља (World of Health) – health programme
Грађанин (Citizen) – programme about national minorities
Интерфејс (Interface) – IT magazine
Horizon (Хоризонт)

Culture and art
Беоклут (Beokult) – culture magazine
Sunday Evening
Арт зона (Art zone)
ТВ фељтон
Хит либрис (Hit Libris) – book magazine
Читање позоришта (Reading a Theatre) – theatre magazine
Bunt ( Rebellion)

Sports
Serbian Cup (Куп Србије)
Four Hills Tournament (Четири скакаонице)
Свет спорта (World of Sport) – weekly news magazine
Тотал тенис (Total Tennis) – tennis magazine

Previously on RTS2

Foreign series
The Sopranos (Породица Сопрано)
Back To You (Повратак на ново)
Desperate Housewives (Очајне домаћице)
Commander in Chief (Председница)
Alias (Алијас)
Capri (Капри)
Ally McBeal (Али Мекбил)
Millennium (Миленијум)
Twin Peaks (Твин пикс)
The X-Files (Досије Икс)

See also
RTS1
RTS3
RTS

External links

Television stations in Serbia
Television channels in North Macedonia
Radio Television of Serbia
Television channels and stations established in 1971
Legislature broadcasters